Joseph Patrick Kennith Mount (born 11 September 1982) is an English musician and record producer. He is the founder of British band Metronomy.

Biography
Mount started out as a rock and roll drummer, playing in various bands at school and then in his mid teens with The Upsides and The Customers. He also taught drums to kids in his local area. His first forays into electronic music started with him buying an old G3 computer from his father. It was with this setup that he set about creating beats and discovered he knew a lot more about melody than he thought he did and he began to compose music under the Metronomy moniker.

Mount attended Brighton University; fellow alumni are Samuel Preston, Good Shoes, The Maccabees and DJ Scotch Egg. Speaking of influences, he mentioned "people who’ve written, recorded and produced things all on their own, like Prince," but also "a lot of electronica, like Autechre and Funkstörung, and pop music and bands too, people like David Bowie and The Ramones, and these weird old folk records my parents had, like Blowzabella."

Mount now lives in Paris. He has two sons.

Songwriting and production credits

References

English electronic musicians
1982 births
Alumni of the University of Brighton
Living people